Haliotis rubiginosa, common name the Lord Howe abalone, is a species of sea snail, a marine gastropod mollusk in the family Haliotidae, the abalones.

This species was previously stated as a  synonym, subspecies or form of Haliotis varia Linnaeus, 1758

Description
The size of the shell varies between 30 mm and 50 mm. "The ovate shell is rather convex, radiately plicately wrinkled and spirally ridged. The ridges are obtusely scaled. The six open perforations are rather approximated. The exterior surface is rusty orange, spirally streaked with white. Besides the peculiarity of its sculpture, it is very fairly characterized by its rusty orange painting and silvery interior."

Distribution and habitat
This marine species occurs in the littoral zone of Lord Howe Island, from the intertidal zone down to about 10 meters depth.

References

Further reading
 Reeve, L.A. 1846. Descriptions of forty species of Haliotis, from the collection of H. Cumming, Esq. Proceedings of the Zoological Society of London 14: 53–59 
 Iredale, T. 1929. Queensland molluscan notes, No. 1. Memoirs of the Queensland Museum 9(3): 261–297, pls 30–31 
 Geiger, D.L. 2000 [1999]. Distribution and biogeography of the recent Haliotidae (Gastropoda: Vetigastropoda) world-wide. Bollettino Malacologico 35(5–12): 57–120 
 Geiger, D.L. & Poppe, G.T. 2000. A Conchological Iconography. The family Haliotidae. Germany : ConchBooks 135 pp
 Geiger, D.L. & Owen, B. 2012. Abalone: Worldwide Haliotidae. Hackenheim, Germany : ConchBooks 361 pp.

External links
 

rubiginosa
Molluscs of the Pacific Ocean
Gastropods of Lord Howe Island
Endemic fauna of Australia
Gastropods described in 1846
Taxa named by Lovell Augustus Reeve